This is a list of the National Register of Historic Places listings in Fond du Lac County, Wisconsin. It is intended to provide a comprehensive listing of entries in the National Register of Historic Places that are located in Fond du Lac County, Wisconsin.  The locations of National Register properties for which the latitude and longitude coordinates are included below may be seen in a map.

There are 52 properties and districts listed on the National Register in the county.

Current listings

|}

See also
List of National Historic Landmarks in Wisconsin
National Register of Historic Places listings in Wisconsin
Listings in neighboring counties: Calumet, Dodge, Green Lake, Sheboygan, Washington, Winnebago

References

Fond Du Lac